Mount Brydges/Warren Field Aerodrome  is located  northeast of Mount Brydges, Ontario, Canada.

References

Registered aerodromes in Ontario